The M114 is a towed howitzer developed and used by the United States Army. It was first produced in 1942 as a medium artillery piece under the designation of 155 mm Howitzer M1. It saw service with the US Army during World War II, the Korean War, and the Vietnam War, before being replaced by the M198 howitzer.

The gun was also used by the armed forces of many nations. The M114A1 remains in service in some countries.

Development
A new carriage was under development for much of the 1930s for the existing World War I-era M-1918 155 mm howitzer, which was a license-built French Canon de 155 C modèle 1917 Schneider until 1939 when it was realized that it did not seem logical to put a new carriage underneath an obsolete howitzer. So development began anew with a carriage designed to be used for either the 155 mm howitzer or the  gun. This was completed by 15 May 1941 when the Howitzer M1 on the Carriage M1 was standardized. The howitzer itself differed from the older model by a lengthened barrel of 20 calibers and a new breech mechanism. Uniquely it was the sole 'slow-cone' interrupted screw mechanism to enter US service after 1920. This meant that two separate movements were necessary to open the breech, versus the single movement of the 'steep cone' mechanism that simultaneously rotated and withdrew the breech.

The M1A1 was redesignated as the M114A1 in 1962.

Carriage variants
The carriage was also used by the 4.5 inch Gun M-1. It went through a number of minor changes over time. The original Warner electric brakes were replaced by Westinghouse air brakes on the M1A1. Both the M1 and M1A1 carriages used a mid-axle firing pedestal that was extended by a ratchet mechanism. The M1A2 replaced the ratchet with a screw-jack system and also modified the traveling lock. The M1A1E1 carriage was intended for use in jungle and muddy terrain and replaced the wheels of the M1A1 with a free-wheeling tracked suspension, but the project was terminated after V-J day without having reached production. The T-9 and T-10 carriages were projects using low-grade steel alloys that were canceled when no longer needed.

A mid-1960s variant was the 155mm XM123 & M123A1 auxiliary-propelled howitzers. The XM123 was produced by American Machine and Foundry and outfitted with two 20 horsepower air-cooled engines produced by Consolidated Diesel Corporation, driver's seat, steering wheel, and guide wheel on the left trail, allowing it to be more rapidly emplaced when detached from the prime mover, while the XM123A1 provided a single 20 horsepower motor with electric steering. The extra weight on the left trail displaced the howitzer after each round was fired, requiring it to be realigned, and the project was abandoned. The concept was copied from the Soviet 85mm SD-44 auxiliary-propelled antitank gun developed in 1954 and used by airborne forces.

Self-propelled mounts
The howitzer was experimentally mounted on a lengthened chassis of the M5 light tank. The resulting vehicle received the designation 155 mm Howitzer Motor Carriage T64. A single prototype was built before the T64 project was abandoned in favor of T64E1, based on the M24 Chaffee light tank chassis. This was eventually adopted as the M41 Howitzer Motor Carriage and saw action in the Korean War. Towards the end of the Korean War the US Army replaced the M41 self-propelled howitzer with the M44 self-propelled howitzer.

Ammunition

The gun fires separate-loading, bagged charge ammunition, with up to seven different propelling charges, from 1 (the smallest) to 7 (the largest). Muzzle velocity, range and penetration in the tables below are for maximum charge in form of complete M4A1 propelling charge.

Operators

Current operators
 : 24 
 : 6 
 : 95 in the Army and 8 with the Marines 
 : 12 
 : 6
 : 70 
 : 18 
 : 12 
 : 18 
 : donated by Turkey in 2020
 
 : 20 
  : 100 in service
 : 144 in service with the Pakistan Army.
 : 36 
 : 12 as of 2022
 : 24 
 : 50 
 : The Armed Forces acquired since Sep 1951, and 294 M1s were in service at the end of the Korean War. Later produced locally as KM114 in 1970s.
 : 12 
  Syrian National Army: donated by Turkey in 2020
 : 750 
 : 48 , In reserve
 : 12 
 : 517 
 : 8 
 : 12

Former operators
 
 
 
 
 
 
 
 : 271 total, withdrawn in 2012
 
 
 
 
 
 
 
 
  (passed on to successor states)

See also
 List of U.S. Army weapons by supply catalog designation (SNL C-39)
 M549
 M864
 M795
 W48
 M777 howitzer

References
Notes

Bibliography

External links
 The M114 155mm howitzer
 M114 
 

155 mm artillery
Cold War artillery of the United States
World War II artillery of the United States
World War II howitzers
Weapons and ammunition introduced in 1942